The Morar Railway Viaduct is a railway viaduct that carries the West Highland Line over the River Morar.

History

The Morar Railway Viaduct is a Category B listed building.

Design
The viaduct carries the northern extent of the West Highland Line over the River Morar, a short river linking Loch Morar to the sea.

It has three arches of rusticated concrete, and carries a single track of railway. The B8008 public road and the river go through the larger middle arch, which is of  span, and an unmarked road through the south arch.

References

Sources
 

Railway bridges in Scotland
Category B listed buildings in Highland (council area)
Listed bridges in Scotland
Lochaber
Bridges in Highland (council area)
Bridges completed in 1901
1901 establishments in Scotland